Firdous Colony, officially Firdous Cooperative Housing Society, is a neighborhood in the Karachi Central district of Karachi, Pakistan. It is a part of Liaquatabad Town, which was disbanded in 2011 but later was restored in early 2022.

There are several ethnic groups in Firdous Colony including Urdu/Muhajirs, Punjabis, Sindhis, Kashmiris, Seraikis, Pakhtuns, Balochs, Memons, Bohras,  Ismailis, Tatari etc. Over 99% of the population is Muslim. The population of Liaquatabad Town is estimated to be nearly one million.

References

Neighbourhoods of Karachi
Liaquatabad Town